James Eardley Hill (5 July 1832 – 8 October 1899) was an English first-class cricketer and barrister.

The son of the barrister Hugh Hill, he was born at St Pancreas in July 1832. He was educated at Harrow School, before going up to Trinity College, Cambridge. He was admitted to the Middle Temple in April 1855 and was called to the bar to practice as a barrister in November 1858, with Hill practicing on the North Eastern Circuit. A keen amateur cricketer, he played two first-class cricket matches for the Marylebone Cricket Club in 1857, against Cambridge University and Kent. He scored 21 runs in his two matches, with a highest score of 18. Hill died in October 1899 at his residence in Paddington, following a short illness.

References

External links

1832 births
1899 deaths
People from St Pancras, London
People educated at Harrow School
Alumni of Trinity College, Cambridge
Members of the Middle Temple
English cricketers
Marylebone Cricket Club cricketers
English barristers